Rocasaurus (meaning "General Roca lizard") is a genus of titanosaurian sauropod that lived in South America. Rocasaurus was discovered in Argentina in 2000, within the Allen Formation which is dated to be middle Campanian to early Maastrichtian in age (75 to 70 million years ago in the Late Cretaceous). It seems to be closely related to saltasaurid dinosaurs, like Saltasaurus and Neuquensaurus.

The type species, Rocasaurus muniozi, was formally described by Leonardo Salgado and Azpilicueta in 2000. New specimens were described in 2021.

References

External links 
 Dinosaur Mailing List entry which announces the discovery of Rocasaurus

Saltasaurids
Campanian life
Maastrichtian life
Late Cretaceous dinosaurs of South America
Allen Formation
Fossils of Argentina
Fossil taxa described in 2000
Cretaceous Argentina